AERC may refer to one of the following.

 Association of European Rarities Committees
 Applied Economics Research Centre, Karachi University